San Marcos Pass (Chumash: Mistaxiwax) is a mountain pass in the Santa Ynez Mountains in southern California.

It is traversed by State Route 154. The pass crosses the Santa Ynez through a southwestern portion of Los Padres National Forest, and connects Los Olivos (and the Santa Ynez Valley) with Santa Barbara, California along the Pacific coast. The road has been designated as a daylight-headlight highway by the California Highway Patrol and Caltrans because of frequent accidents, particularly around the exit for Lake Cachuma.

Geography
The pass is one of three passages across the steep Santa Ynez Mountains, and the nearest to Santa Barbara. The Painted Cave community and Laurel Springs Ranch near Chumash Painted Cave SHP is four miles east of San Marcos Pass via East Camino Cielo Road, which intersects with SR 154 right at the summit.

San Marcos Pass is a shorter but hillier alternative to using Highway 101 through Gaviota Pass.

"Battle" of Fremont's Pass
No shots were fired during this "battle", which consisted solely of John C. Frémont's California Battalion crossing the mountains via San Marcos Pass on the night of December 24, 1846, during the Mexican–American War. At that time the Pass was only a path, and a rough one at that. It was a rainy night, and while Frémont's battalion had lost 150 horses and mules from sliding down the muddy slopes during the crossing, the exhausted men were able to reach the Goleta Valley foothills by the next morning, where they camped for two days. On December 27, 1846, they entered into Santa Barbara and ran up the Stars and Stripes at the Thompson Adobe (now 809–811 State Street). No force defended the town: all local men had gone to Los Angeles earlier that week to join the forces under Captain Flores and General Andrés Pico. These forces surrendered to Frémont on January 13, 1847, a little more than two weeks later, at Cahuenga Pass near Los Angeles.

A California Historical Landmark marker commemorates the "battle", but is instead located at Gaviota Pass, where the Mexicans were waiting to ambush Fremont, expecting he would go through there instead of the San Marcos Pass.

A local Army National Guard center is named after Frémont, in recognition of his capturing Santa Barbara and making it part of the United States.

The local legend of "Frémont's Cannon" derives from this battle.

In popular culture

 Road Trip with Huell Howser Episode 108

See also
State Route 154
Cold Spring Canyon Arch Bridge
Santa Ynez Valley
Santa Ynez Mountains
Santa Barbara, California

References

Santa Barbara :: Restaurants, Hotels, Central Coast Wineries and more defunct as of May 1, 2007.  copy on archive.org dated 7 February 2006, retrieved 1 May 2007.
Tompkins, Walker A.  Santa Barbara, Past and Present.  Tecolote Books, Casa de la Guerra, Santa Barbara.  1975.

External links 
 Huell Howser Roadtrip #108
 Report by Ewan J. Kummel, Copyright 1996, Released under GFDL in 2005
Archive.org copy of San Marcos Pass - Santa Barbara, CA 93101 - Attractions @ Virtual-SantaBarbara.com dated 26 May 2005 retrieved 1 May 2007.

Mountain passes of California
Landforms of Santa Barbara County, California
History of Santa Barbara County, California
Los Padres National Forest
Santa Ynez Mountains